Jeffrey Yohalem is an American director and writer of video games. After graduating cum laude from Yale University with a degree in English literature, he joined the Ubisoft Montreal studio, working on the games Tom Clancy's Rainbow Six Vegas 2 and Assassin's Creed II, before writing Assassin's Creed: Brotherhood, Far Cry 3, Child of Light, and Assassin's Creed: Syndicate. His most recent published project is Immortals Fenyx Rising, released in December 2020.

In the past, he filmed and directed the documentary Human Eaters, and was an intern at The Daily Show with Jon Stewart.

Jeffrey has won a Writers Guild of America Award for his work as lead writer of Assassin's Creed: Brotherhood. He was also nominated for a Writers Guild of America Award and a BAFTA Games Award for his work on Assassin's Creed II. He went on to be nominated for the Writer’s Guild Award for Assassin’s Creed III, Revelations, Unity and Syndicate, making him the most nominated writer in the category’s history.

Jeffrey is openly gay, and has stated that "I grew up playing games as an escape from the bullies at school", which helped lead him to his current career path.

Writing credits

References

External links
 
 Jeffrey Yohalem on Twitter

American game designers
Jewish American writers
Living people
Year of birth uncertain
Ubisoft people
American gay writers
Place of birth missing (living people)
Yale College alumni
Video game writers
21st-century American Jews
Year of birth missing (living people)